David Ian Pool  (22 November 1936 – 28 April 2022) was a New Zealand demographer. He was the inaugural director of the Population Studies Centre at the University of Waikato from 1980 to 2004, and was made a professor emeritus when he retired from the university in 2010.

Biography
Born on 22 November 1936 at "Edenholme", a private maternity home in the Auckland suburb of Mount Eden, Pool was the son of Doris Pool (née Messer) and James Pool. He grew up in Dargaville, and went on to study at Auckland University College, graduating with a Bachelor of Arts degree in 1958, and a Master of Arts with second-class honours in 1960. He then earned a PhD at the Australian National University in 1964 with a thesis titled The Maori population of New Zealand, supervised by W. D. Borrie.

An expert on the demographics of Māori from pre-colonial times, as well as on the New Zealand population in general, Pool also researched and published on African demography, and undertook missions for international organisations including the United Nations Population Fund and the Population Council in French- and English-speaking African nations, as well as in Asia and the Pacific. He coined the term baby blippers in reference to the offspring of the later baby boomers in New Zealand, sometimes called the echo boomers.

Pool founded the Population Studies Centre at the University of Waikato in 1980, and remained as director of the centre until 2004. Following his retirement from the University of Waikato in 2010, he was conferred with the title of professor emeritus.

In 1994, Pool was elected a Fellow of the Royal Society of New Zealand, and was awarded the society's James Cook Fellowship for 2004–2006. In 2007, he was accorded life membership of the Population Association of New Zealand. He was appointed a Companion of the New Zealand Order of Merit, for services to demography, in the 2013 New Year Honours.

Pool was married to Janet Sceats, also a demographer, for nearly 60 years, and the couple had two children. He died in Hamilton on 28 April 2022.

Selected publications

References

1936 births
2022 deaths
People from Auckland
People from Dargaville
University of Auckland alumni
Australian National University alumni
New Zealand demographers
Academic staff of the University of Waikato
Fellows of the Royal Society of New Zealand
Companions of the New Zealand Order of Merit